Scott Davidson may refer to:
Scott Davidson (lacrosse) (born 1982), lacrosse player
Scott Davidson (musician), publisher, former keyboards player with Bros and the Pet Shop Boys, and ex-chairman of Bristol City F.C.
Scott Davidson (academic), Vice-Chancellor of Newman University Birmingham

See also
Thomas Scott Davidson (1858–1933), Canadian politician
Scotty Davidson (1892–1915), Canadian ice hockey player
Scott Davison (born 1970), baseball player